The following is a list of basketball video games. Most of these sports video games represent basketball in the National Basketball Association (NBA).

Franchises
 Barkley Shut Up and Jam!
 College Hoops
 Double Dribble
 ESPN NBA 2Night
 NBA Playoffs
 NBA
 NBA 2K
 NBA All-Star Challenge
 NBA Ballers
 NBA Courtside
 NBA in the Zone
 NBA Jam
 NBA Live
 NBA ShootOut
 NBA Street
 NCAA Basketball
 Run and Gun
 Slam Dunk
 Tecmo NBA Basketball

Games

References

Basketball